Akıncılar (Kurdish: Ezbider) is a town and a district of Sivas Province of Turkey. The mayor is Hasan Şen (AKP).

References

Towns in Turkey
Populated places in Sivas Province
Districts of Sivas Province